Ribonuclease alpha (2'-O-methyl RNase) is an enzyme. This enzyme catalyses the following chemical reaction

 Endonucleolytic cleavage to 5'-phosphomonoester

This enzyme is specific for O-methylated RNA.

References

External links 

EC 3.1.26